Jacqueline Baird (born 1 April in Northumberland, England) is popular English writer of over 30 romance novels since 1988.

Awards
 Romantic Times Reviewers Choice Award 1998. Best Harlequin Presents
 Romantic Times Wishes
 Numerous Waldenbooks Series Best-seller List
 Numerous British Best-seller List
 USA Today Best -seller List. April 2010

Bibliography

Single novels
 Dark Desiring (1988)
 Shattered Trust (1990) Romano2(Kristine Series) by Martha Cecilia Tagalog version.
 Passionate Betrayal (1991)
 Dishonourable Proposal (1992)
 Guilty Passion (1992)
 Master of Passion (1993)
 Gamble on Passion (1994)
 Nothing Changes Love (1994)
 A Devious Desire (1995)
 The Valentine Child (1995)
 Raul's Revenge (1996)
 The Reluctant Fiancee (1997)
 Mistaken for a Mistress (1997)
 Giordanni's Proposal (1998)
 A Husband of Convenience (1999)
 Husband on Trust (2000)
 A Most Passionate Revenge (2000)
 Marriage at His Convenience (2001)
 The Italian's Runaway Bride (2001)
 The Greek Tycoon's Revenge (2002)
 Wife, Bought and Paid for (2002)
 At the Spaniard's Pleasure (2003)
 His Inherited Bride (2003)
 The Greek Tycoon's Love-child (2004)
 Pregnancy of Revenge (2005)
 The Italian's Blackmailed Mistress (2006)
 Bought by the Greek Tycoon (2006)
 Aristides' Convenient Wife (2007)
 The Italian Billionaire's Ruthless Revenge (2008)
 The Billionaire's Blackmailed Bride (2008)
 Untamed Italian Blackmailed Innocent(2010) 
 The Sabbides Secret Baby(2010)
 Picture of Innocence(2011)
 Returen of the Moralis Wife(2012)
  la maitresse trahie (2012 ) 
  The Cost of Her Innocence(2013)

Italian Husbands Series Multi-Author
Pregnancy of Revenge (2005)

Collections
 Dark Desiring / Dishonourable Proposal (2004)

Omnibus
 Father Knows Last: High Risk, Guilty Passion (1996) (with Emma Darcy)
 Passion with a Vengeance (1998) (with Sara Craven and Emma Darcy)
 Her Baby Secret (1999) (with Lynne Graham and Day Leclaire)
 Father and Child (2000) (with Emma Darcy and Sandra Marton)
 Stranded in Paradise (2001) (with Liz Fielding and Miranda Lee)
 Passionate Playboys (2002) (with Amanda Browning and Lynne Graham)
 Her Greek Tycoon (2003) (with Lynne Graham and Kate Walker)
 Passion in Paradise (2004) (with Sara Craven and Cathy Williams)
 Hot Summer Loving (2004) (with Sandra Field and Miranda Lee)
 The Tycoon's Love Child (2005) (with Robyn Donald and Anne Mather)
 Red-Hot Revenge (2006) (with Lee Wilkinson and Cathy Williams)
 Convenient Weddings (2006) (with Helen Bianchin and Kathryn Ross)
 Millionaire's Mistress (2006) (with Lynne Graham and Cathy Williams)
 Seductive Spaniards (2007) (with Diana Hamilton)

References and sources
 Jacqueline Baird's Webpage in Harlequin Enterprises Ltd Website
 Jacqueline Baird's Webpage in Harlequin Presents Website
 Jacqueline Baird's Webpage in Fantastic Fiction's Website

English romantic fiction writers
Year of birth missing (living people)
Living people
English women novelists
Women romantic fiction writers